John Perring may refer to:

 John Shae Perring, British engineer & Egyptologist
Sir John Perring, 1st Baronet (1765–1831), Lord Mayor of London, 1803, MP for New Romney and Hythe
Sir John Perring, 2nd Baronet (1794–1843) of the Perring baronets
Sir John Raymond Perring, 2nd Baronet (born 1931) of the Perring baronets

See also
John Perrin (disambiguation)